Walter Lawrence "Pud" Kitchen (December 18, 1912 – July 18, 1988) was a Canadian ice hockey player who competed in the 1936 Winter Olympics. As owner of the horse Hail To Patsy, he won the 1969 Kentucky Oaks at Churchill Downs. Kitchen was a member of the 1936 Port Arthur Bearcats, which won the silver medal for Canada in ice hockey at the 1936 Winter Olympics. In 1987 he was inducted into the Northwestern Ontario Sports Hall of Fame as a member of that Olympic team.

References

External links

profile

1912 births
1988 deaths
Canadian ice hockey defencemen
Ice hockey people from Toronto
Ice hockey players at the 1936 Winter Olympics
Medalists at the 1936 Winter Olympics
Olympic ice hockey players of Canada
Olympic medalists in ice hockey
Olympic silver medalists for Canada
Toronto Marlboros players
20th-century Canadian people